Ribes  is a genus of about 200 known species of flowering plants, most of them native to the temperate regions of the Northern Hemisphere. The various species are known as currants or gooseberries, and some are cultivated for their edible fruit or as ornamental plants. Ribes is the only genus in the family Grossulariaceae.

Description
Ribes species are medium shrublike plants with marked diversity in strikingly diverse flowers and fruit. They have either palmately lobed or compound leaves, and some have thorns. The sepals of the flowers are larger than the petals, and fuse into a tube or saucer shape. The ovary is inferior, maturing into a berry with many seeds.

Taxonomy
Ribes is the single genus in the Saxifragales family Grossulariaceae. Although once included in the broader circumscription of Saxifragaceae sensu lato, it is now positioned as a sister group to Saxifragaceae sensu stricto.

Subdivision
First treated on a worldwide basis in 1907, the infrageneric classification has undergone many revisions, and even in the era of molecular phylogenetics there has been contradictory evidence. Although sometimes treated as two separate genera, Ribes and Grossularia (Berger 1924), the consensus has been to consider it as a single genus, divided into a number of subgenera, the main ones of which are subgenus Ribes (currants) and subgenus Grossularia (gooseberries), further subdivided into sections. Janczewski (1907) considered six subgenera and eleven sections. Berger's twelve subgenera based on two distinct genera (see  Table 1) have subsequently been demoted to sections. Weigend (2007) elevated a number of sections to produce a taxonomy of seven subgenera; Ribes (sections Ribes, Heretiera, Berisia) Coreosma, Calobotrya (sections Calobotrya, Cerophyllum), Symphocalyx, Grossularioides, Grossularia, Parilla.

Taxonomy, according to Berger, modified by Sinnott (1985):
 Subgenus Ribes L. (currants) 8 sections
 Section Berisia Spach (alpine currants)
 Section Calobotrya (Spach) Jancz. (ornamental currants)
 Section Coreosma (Spach) Jancz. (black currants)
 Section Grossularioides ( Jancz.) Rehd. (spiny or Gooseberry-stemmed currants)
 Section Heritiera Jancz. (dwarf or skunk currants)
 Section Parilla Jancz. (Andine or South American currants)
 Section Ribes L. (red currants)
 Section Symphocalyx Berland. (golden currants)
 Subgenus Grossularia (Mill.) Pers. (Gooseberries) 4 sections
 Section Grossularia (Mill.) Nutt.
 Section Robsonia Berland.
 Section Hesperia A.Berger
 Section Lobbia A. Berger

Some authors continued to treat Hesperia and Lobbia as subgenera. Early molecular studies suggested that subgenus Grossularia was actually embedded within subgenus Ribes. Analysis of combined molecular datasets confirms subgenus Grossularia as a monophyletic group, with two main lineages, sect. Grossularia and another clade consisting of glabrous gooseberies, including Hesperia, Lobbia and Robsonia. Other monophyletic groups identified were Calobotrya, Parilla, Symphocalyx and Berisia. However sections Ribes, Coreosma and Heritiera were not well supported. Consequently, there is insufficient resolution to justify further taxonomic revision.

Species

There are around 200 species of Ribes. Selected species include:
Ribes alpinum
Ribes aureum
Ribes cereum
Ribes divaricatum
Ribes glandulosum
Ribes hirtellum
Ribes hudsonianum
Ribes inerme
Ribes lacustre
Ribes laurifolium
Ribes lobbii
Ribes montigenum
Ribes nevadense
Ribes nigrum
Ribes oxyacanthoides
Ribes rubrum
Ribes sanguineum
Ribes speciosum
Ribes triste
Ribes uva-crispa

Distribution and habitat
Ribes is widely distributed through the Northern Hemisphere, and also extending south in the mountainous areas of South America. Species can be found in meadows or near streams.

Ecology

Currants are used as food plants by the larvae of some Lepidoptera species.

Cultivation
The genus Ribes includes the edible currants: blackcurrant, redcurrant and white currant, as well as the European gooseberry Ribes uva-crispa and several hybrid varieties. It should not be confused with the dried currants used in cakes and puddings, which are from the Zante currant, a small-fruited cultivar of the grape Vitis vinifera. Ribes gives its name to the popular blackcurrant cordial Ribena.

The genus also includes the group of ornamental plants collectively known as the flowering currants, for instance R. sanguineum.

United States 
There are restrictions on growing some Ribes species in some U.S. states, as they are the main alternate host for white pine blister rust.

Uses
Blackfoot people used blackcurrant root (Ribes hudsonianum) for the treatment of kidney diseases and menstrual and menopausal problems. The Cree used the fruit of Ribes glandulosum as a fertility enhancer to assist women in becoming pregnant.

European immigrants who settled in North America in the 18th-century typically made wine from both red and white currants.

References

Bibliography

Books and theses
 
 
 
 
 
 
 
 , in

Articles

Websites
 
 
 
 Entry on Ribes at Mark Rieger's UGa fruit crops site

External links

Ribes
Saxifragales genera
Edible plants
Garden plants of North America
Garden plants of Europe
Garden plants of Asia
Shrubs
Drought-tolerant plants
Bird food plants
Butterfly food plants
Plants used in traditional Native American medicine
Taxa named by Carl Linnaeus
Melliferous flowers